Flottbek is a small river of Hamburg, Germany. It flows into the Elbe near Hamburg-Othmarschen.

See also
List of rivers of Hamburg

Rivers of Hamburg
Rivers of Germany